Cəfərli (also, Dzhafarli and Dzhafarly Pervoye) is a village and municipality in the Imishli Rayon of Azerbaijan.  It has a population of 3,509.  The municipality consists of the villages of Cəfərli and Hacımustafalı.

References 

Populated places in Imishli District